

League standings
 The first four teams Qualify to Qatar Cup.

References 

Volleyball in Qatar
2014 in volleyball
2014 in Qatari sport
2015 in volleyball
2015 in Qatari sport